E3 ubiquitin-protein ligase RNF25 is an enzyme that in humans is encoded by the RNF25 gene.

Function 

The protein encoded by this gene contains a RING finger motif. The mouse counterpart of this protein has been shown to interact with Rela, the p65 subunit of NF-kappaB (NF-κB), and modulate NF-κB-mediated transcription activity. The mouse protein also binds ubiquitin-conjugating enzymes (E2s) and is a substrate for E2-dependent ubiquitination.

Interactions 

RNF25 has been shown to interact with RELA.

References

Further reading 

 
 
 
 

RING finger proteins